Kim Chun-wol (born 24 August 1974) is a North Korean speed skater.  She competed in three events at the 1992 Winter Olympics.

References

1974 births
Living people
North Korean female speed skaters
Olympic speed skaters of North Korea
Speed skaters at the 1992 Winter Olympics
Place of birth missing (living people)
Speed skaters at the 1990 Asian Winter Games